The 57th Technology and Engineering Emmy Awards was held on 29 September 2005. The National Television Academy announced the winners at Bristol-Myers Squibb in Princeton, New Jersey.

Awardees
For slow-motion color recording and playback for broadcast:
Ampex
ABC
For closed caption standardization:
ABC, American Broadcasting Company
PBS, Public Broadcasting Service
CEA, Consumer Electronics Association
For pioneering development of locally integrated and branded content using IP Store and forward technology:
The WB
IBM
For lens technology developments for solid state imagers cameras in high definition formats:
Canon USA Inc.
Fujinon
Thales Angeniux
For the first intercontinental satellite TV transmission:
AT&T

Video Gaming Technology and Applications
Emmys were also bestowed for Video Gaming Technology and Applications, for the second year running. The award recognizes pioneering efforts and breakthroughs in the gaming world.

Development and Impact in 8-bit consoles:
Atari, Inc. for Atari 2600
Development and Impact in Polygon consoles:
Sony for PlayStation
Development of Multiplayer console technology:
Microsoft for Xbox Live

Advanced Media Technology
The Advanced Media Technology awards honor the work being done in Interactive Television, New Media and related programming and technology. The technologies that are considered in this group embrace the expanded definition of television and include non-linear creation and distribution, point to point delivery, one and two screen television technologies and gaming for television delivery.

The winner for Outstanding Achievement in Advanced Media Technology for the Enhancement of Original Television Content is:
TOURCast by PGATour.com
The winner for Outstanding Achievement in Advanced Media Technology for the Non-Synchronous Enhancement of Original Television Content is:
ImageGuide/www.living.com by EAT.tv, LLC/Scripps Networks
The winner for Outstanding Achievement in Advanced Media Technology for the Creation of Non-Traditional Programs or Platforms is:
Moxi Media Center: New Features for 2005 by Digeo

Lifetime Achievement Award
For the first time, the Academy bestowed a Lifetime Achievement Award in the area of Technology and Engineering. Mark Cuban, owner of the Dallas Mavericks and founder of HDnet, presented the award to the original inventors of the videotape recorder: Charlie Ginsburg, Ray Dolby, Alex Maxey, Charlie Anderson, Fred Pfost and Shelby Henderson. The six men, all then working for Ampex, introduced the VR-1000, (later named the Ampex Mark IV) the first practical videotape recorder, to the world on 14 March 1956 at the National Association of Radio and Television Broadcasters convention in Chicago.

References

External links

Technology & Engineering Emmy Awards
2005 awards
2005 in New Jersey
Princeton, New Jersey
September 2005 events in the United States